H. G. Wells (1866–1946) was an English author.

H. G. Wells may also refer to:

Places
H. G. Wells (crater), a lunar crater

People and characters
Henry Gordon Wells (1879–1954), American lawyer and politician

Characters
 Helena G. Wells, a character on Warehouse 13
 H. G. Wells, a St. Bernard dog in the sit-com Father, Dear Father

Other uses
H. G. Wells: War with the World, a 2006 BBC Television docudrama
 H.G. Wells: Early Writings in Science and Science Fiction (book), a 1975 collection
 RSS H.G. Wells, a Blue Origin space capsule for New Shepard

See also

 H. G. Wells Society, organizations supporting the ideas of H. G. Wells
 H. G. Welles, a fictional character from Cataclysmo and the Time Boys
 
 Wells (disambiguation)
 Welles (disambiguation)
 Welle (disambiguation)
 Well (disambiguation)